McDaniels is an unincorporated community in Pickens County, in the U.S. state of Georgia.

History
The community was named after P. E. McDaniel, the original owner of the town site. The community post office was called "McHenry". This "McHenry" post office was in operation from 1888 until 1907.

References

Unincorporated communities in Gordon County, Georgia
Unincorporated communities in Georgia (U.S. state)